This is a list of the squads picked for the 2011 Cricket World Cup.  The oldest player at the 2011 World Cup was John Davison (40) of Canada while the youngest was Nitish Kumar (16) also of Canada.

Group A

Australia
Coach:  Tim Nielsen

1,2 Callum Ferguson and  Jason Krezja replaced Michael Hussey and Nathan Hauritz respectively, who were included in the original squad but pulled out due to injury.
3Michael Hussey later returned to the squad, replacing Doug Bollinger, who was ruled out with injury midway through the initial group stage.

Canada
Coach:  Pubudu Dassanayake

Kenya
Coach:  Eldine Baptiste

New Zealand
Coach:  John Wright

Pakistan
Coach:  Waqar Younis

1 Mohammad Junaid Khan replaced Sohail Tanvir, who was originally selected before pulling out due to injury.

Sri Lanka
Coach:  Trevor Bayliss

  Muttiah Muralitharan  and Angelo Mathews have forced the Sri Lankan team to call up Chaminda Vaas and  Suraj Randiv respectively, as standbys ahead of the World Cup final against India

Zimbabwe
Coach:  Alan Butcher

1 Terry Duffin, 2 Tinashe Panyangara & 3Vusi Sibanda replaced Tino Mawoyo, Ed Rainsford & Sean Williams, who were included in the original squad but pulled out due to injury.

Group B

Bangladesh
Coach:  Jamie Siddons

England
Coach:  Andy Flower

1 Ravi Bopara replaced Eoin Morgan, who was originally selected before pulling out due to injury.
2 Eoin Morgan later rejoined the squad, replacing Kevin Pietersen, who was ruled out with a hernia midway through the initial group stage.
3 Chris Tremlett replaced Stuart Broad, who was ruled out with a side injury midway through the initial group stage.
4 Jade Dernbach replaced Ajmal Shahzad, who was ruled out with a hamstring strain midway through the initial group stage.
5 Adil Rashid replaced Michael Yardy who was ruled out before England's quarter-final match with Sri Lanka after suffering from depression.

India

Coach:  Gary Kirsten

1 Sreesanth replaced Praveen Kumar, who was originally selected before pulling out due to injury.

Ireland
Coach:  Phil Simmons

Netherlands
Coach:  Peter Drinnen

South Africa
Coach:  Corrie van Zyl

West Indies
Coach:  Ottis Gibson

1,2,3 Devon Thomas, Kirk Edwards and Devendra Bishoo replaced Carlton Baugh, Adrian Barath and Dwayne Bravo respectively, who were included in the original squad but pulled out due to injury.

References and notes

External links
 Cricinfo: ICC Cricket World Cup squad listings
 worldcupofcricket: 2011 Cricket World Cup Squads

Cricket World Cup squads